Philipp Marx and Florin Mergea were the defending champions but Mergea decided not to participate.
Marx played alongside Dustin Brown.

Seeds

Draw

Draw

References
 Main Draw

Citta di Como Challenger - Doubles
2013 Doubles